The Dream Wall is a novel by Graham Dunstan Martin published in 1987.

Plot summary
The Dream Wall is a novel in which the two main characters dream of their 22nd Century Soviet Britain  counterparts.

Reception
Dave Langford reviewed The Dream Wall for White Dwarf #92, and stated that "This witty nightmare has interesting ideas to offer (including a philosophical assault on doctrinaire materialism): I only wish I hadn't read it during a depressing General Election whose result was all too consistent with Martin's nastier alternative future."

Reviews
Review by Jon Wallace (1954 -) (1987) in Vector 139
Review by Lee Montgomerie (1988) in Interzone, #23 Spring 1988

References

1987 British novels